John Goodwin (born September 25, 1961) is a Canadian former ice hockey center.

Junior career
Goodwin had a very successful junior career for the Sault Ste. Marie Greyhounds of the Ontario Hockey League (OHL). Goodwin lead the league in scoring in the 1980-81 OHL season and in turn won the Eddie Powers Memorial Trophy. Additionally, in that season he won the William Hanley Trophy as the most sportsmanlike player.  In the 1978–79 OMJHL season he won the Emms Family Award as the top first year player.

Professional career
Goodwin played five full seasons in the American Hockey League - three with the Nova Scotia Voyageurs, one with the New Haven Nighthawks, and one with the St. Catharines Saints. Goodwin also played two full seasons in the International Hockey League with the Peoria Rivermen.

Coaching career
From 1997-2000 Goodwin was the coach of the Oshawa Generals, winning 97 games.  He is now an assistant coach for the Kingston Frontenacs.

Personal life
Goodwin's sister Cindy is married to hockey commentator Bob McKenzie.

Awards and honours

References

External links

1961 births
Living people
Canadian ice hockey centres
Oshawa Generals coaches
Canadian ice hockey coaches